Jawbone Flats is a ghost town in Marion County, Oregon, United States. Established in 1931, Jawbone Flats was a mining camp founded after miners discovered gold in the region in 1859.

History
Jawbone Flats was established in 1931 by James Hewitt of the Amalgamated Mining Company, after miners had struck gold in the region in 1859. The company processed various metals found in the region, including lead, zinc, copper, and silver. Some of the roads built in the area, including the Gold Creek Bridge, were constructed under President Roosevelt's New Deal in 1939. The town population began to dwindle in the 1950s after snow damaged the buildings, and the mining operations proved unprofitable.

In 1992, after all mining operations had ceased in the region, the Shiny Rock Mining Company gifted  of oldgrowth forest, including Jawbone Flats, to the Friends of Opal Creek, a non-profit historical society. Contemporarily Jawbone Flats is accessible to the public, and hosts educational field trips for schools, as well as other events.

Jawbone Flats was largely destroyed by the Beachie Creek Fire in 2020.

See also

List of ghost towns in Oregon

References

Company towns in Oregon
Ghost towns in Oregon
Former populated places in Marion County, Oregon
1931 establishments in Oregon